Drive Home is an EP released by British musician Steven Wilson, featuring music videos, previously unreleased tracks, and live renditions of several songs recorded at Hugenottenhalle, Frankfurt on 23 March 2013. The EP, which was released on 21 October 2013, was available in two versions: DVD/CD and Blu-ray/CD.

Reception

Thom Jurek of AllMusic praised the title track's "gorgeous meld of Pink Floyd's nocturnal atmospherics, the Moody Blues' melodic majesty, sprawling guitar solos, and Alan Parsons' crystalline production", while also describing the live tracks as "killer readings" which the band members "take ... far outside their studio boundaries." Although the EP would seem to be "for hardcore Wilson fans only, the video disc is alone worth the price of admission", according to Jurek.

Track listing
All songs written by Steven Wilson.

Sources:

Personnel
Musicians
 Steven Wilson – vocals, keyboards, guitars, bass guitar on "The Holy Drinker"
 Nick Beggs – bass guitar, backing vocals, Chapman Stick on "The Holy Drinker"
 Guthrie Govan – lead guitar
 Adam Holzman – keyboards
 Marco Minnemann – drums
 Theo Travis – flutes, saxophones, clarinet

Additional personnel
 Strings arranged by Dave Stewart and performed by the London Session Orchestra (soloist – Perry Montague-Mason)

Production
 Steven Wilson – production, mixing
 Alan Parsons – associate producer, recording engineer
 Brendan Dekora – assistant engineer

Videos
 "Drive Home" – directed by Jess Cope; produced by Tom Kaye; edited by Topher Holland
 "The Raven that Refused to Sing" – directed by Jess Cope and Simon Cartwright; produced by Tom Kaye; edited by Topher Holland
 Live tracks – directed and edited by Bernhard Baran/B-light-pictures; cameras operated by Rüdiger Jonitz, Jochen Fink, Bernhard Baran, Dirk Meissner, Olof Kreidl, Philipp Werle, Manuel Theobald, Simon Loge

Other
 Hajo Mueller – illustrations
 Carl Glover – design
 Ray Shulman (at I-sonic) – Blu-ray/DVD authoring

Source:

Charts

References

Steven Wilson albums
2013 EPs